Road Kill is a 1999 low-budget black comedy directed by Matthew Leutwyler and starring Jennifer Rubin and Erik Palladino. It won two awards in 1999, including the Audience Award for Best Film at the Santa Barbara International Film Festival.

Cast
 Jennifer Rubin as Blue
 Erik Palladino as Alex
 Billy Jayne as Lars
 Anthony John Denison as Mr. Z
 Richard Portnow as Charbonneau
Catherine Dyer as Sara
Jon Polito as Jelly
Chris Codol as Jordy
Matthew Brannan as Ronnie
Amanda Foreman as Shayla
Jeffrey Dean Morgan as Bobby
Jason MacDonald as Frank

Production
Filming locations for Road Kill included Los Angeles, Bakersfield, California, and Palm Springs, California.

References

External links
 

1999 films
Films directed by Matthew Leutwyler
Films shot in California
1990s action films
1990s English-language films
American black comedy films
1990s American films